The year 1597 in science and technology involved some significant events.

Astronomy
 Pieter Dirkszoon Keyser and Frederick de Houtman define 12 southern constellations (1595–1597), introduced later by Johann Bayer in the 1603 text Uranometria: Apus, Chamaeleon, Dorado, Grus, Hydrus, Indus, Musca, Pavo, Phoenix, Triangulum Australe, Tucana, Volans.

Botany
 John Gerard's The Herball, or generall historie of plantes published in London.

Chemistry
 Andreas Libavius's chemistry textbook Alchemia published.

Births
 April 13 – Giovanni Battista Hodierna, Italian astronomer (died 1660)
 Henry Gellibrand, English mathematician (died 1637)

Deaths
 February 6 – Franciscus Patricius (born Franjo Petriš), Venetian philosopher and scientist of Croatian descent (born 1529)
 June 20 – Willem Barentsz, Dutch explorer (born c. 1550) (at sea)

References

 
16th century in science
1590s in science